Cyberon is a direct-to-video unofficial spin-off of the long-running British science fiction television series Doctor Who. It was released direct-to-DVD and produced by the independent production company BBV. It featured the Cyberons, a species created to resemble popular Doctor Who monsters, the Cybermen. The main character of the film, Lauren Anderson, later featured in Zygon: When Being You Just Isn't Enough. Originally released on VHS, the film was not widely available on video. The story was released on DVD from online retailer Galaxy 4 in 2012.

Synopsis
Cyberon is the new experimental drug touted to heal Lauren Anderson's brain damaged patients. Dr. Tom Mordley tells her the drug will revolutionise medical science, but Cyberon has plans of its own.

Cast
 Keith Bell - Cyberon
 Jo Castleton - Lauren Anderson
 Nancy Allen - Karen
 P.J. Ochlan - Tom Mordley
 Oliver Bradshaw - George Cooper
 David Roeciffe - Ray
 Camilla Ochlan - Denise

Novelisation

A novelisation of the film by James Hornby was published 21 September 2020 by Arcbeatle Press. The adapted novelisation also contained extra short stories featuring concepts and characters from Doctor Who related series such as P.R.O.B.E., the Virgin Missing Adventures, the Past Doctor Adventures and the Erimem series. An unabridged audiobook read by Nigel Peever was released for download in November 2021.

References

External links

2000 fantasy films
2000 science fiction films
Bill & Ben Video
British science fiction films
2000s English-language films
2000s British films